The 2013 Wagner Seahawks football team represented Wagner College in the 2013 NCAA Division I FCS football season as a member of the Northeast Conference (NEC). They were led by 33rd-year head coach Walt Hameline and played their home games at Wagner College Stadium.  Wagner the season 3–8 overall and 2–4 in NEC play to tie for sixth place.

Schedule

References

Wagner
Wagner Seahawks football seasons
Wagner Seahawks football